Lee Tze-fan (5 June 1907 Shinchiku-cho (modern-day Hsinchu), Japanese Taiwan - 10 July 1989) was a Taiwanese painter and art teacher. He studied at Taihoku Normal School when he was 14 years old.  His painting career began in 1924 when he was introduced to art by his teacher Kinichiro Ishikawa.

Biography 

Lee Tze-fan was of the first generation of Hoklo Taiwanese artists who created foreign influenced paintings.  His works were performed in the fusion of art styles, between social realism, expressionism and abstractionism.

For a long time he was a professor in National Taiwan Normal University, having many students, mostly from the counties of Hsinchu, Taoyuan, and Miaoli.

Three of his sons Yuan-Chuan Lee, Yuan T. Lee, and Yuan-Pern Lee were elected to membership of Academia Sinica.

See also
Taiwanese art

References 

 Lee Tze-Fan Memorial Art Gallery

Taiwanese painters
Taiwanese people of Hoklo descent
1907 births
1989 deaths
People from Hsinchu
20th-century Taiwanese painters
Academic staff of the National Taiwan Normal University
National Taipei University of Education alumni